Sean Sullivan may refer to:
 Sean Sullivan (actor) (1921–1985), Canadian actor born in Toronto
 Sean Sullivan (naval officer) (born 1958), American naval officer and politician
 Sean Sullivan (boxer) (born 1968), New Zealand professional boxer
 Sean Sullivan (footballer) (born 1971), Maltese professional footballer and coach 
 Sean Sullivan (ice hockey) (born 1984), American ice hockey defenceman
 Sean Sullivan (judoka) (born 1970), Irish Olympic judoka
 Sean M. Sullivan, college soccer player and athletic director at the Catholic University of America

See also
Sean O'Sullivan (disambiguation)